Främling 25 år  is a greatest hits album by Swedish singer Carola Häggkvist.

Track listing

CD 1
Främling
Säg mig var du står
Benjamin
Gör det någonting
Gloria
You Bring Out the Best in Me
Mickey
Se på mig
Liv
Visa lite mänsklighet
14 maj
Du försvinner i natten
Främling / Je ogen hebben geen geheimen / Love isn't Love / Fremder *
Mitt i ett äventyr
Fångad av en stormvind
Evighet

CD 2
Sometimes When We Touch
Om du törs
Butterfly *
Säg mig var vi står
Albatross *
Hunger
Tokyo
Du lever inom mig
I en sommarnatt
Let There Be Love *
Gospel medley (live)
Elvis medley (live) *
What a Feeling (live) *
Fame (live) *
Love isn't Love (Främling)
You Are My Destiny
Captured by a Lovestorm
Invincible

Previously not released on CD *

Release history

Charts

References

2008 greatest hits albums
Carola Häggkvist albums